Bahai may refer to:

A follower of or pertaining to a follower of Baháʼu'lláh
Baháʼí Faith, sometimes called the Baháʼí World Faith or the Baháʼí International Community, the globally recognized Baháʼí community
Baháʼí Terraces also known as the Hanging Gardens of Haifa or Baháʼí gardens, part of the Baháʼí World Centre in Haifa, Israel
Shaykh Bahai, a 16th-century physician from Persia
Sheikh Bahaei University, an Iranian University named after Shaykh Baha'i
Bahai (Jurchen), a Jurchen chieftain of the Liao dynasty (926–1115) of Northern China
 Bahai (Qing dynasty), a Manchu military commander of the Qing dynasty
Bahaï, Chad, a town in the Bourkou-Ennedi-Tibesti Region of Chad
Takht Bahai, the remains of a famous 1st century Buddhist monastery
"Naina Neer Bahai", a song by A. R. Rahman, part of the soundtrack to the 2005 Indian film Water

See also
Bahia (disambiguation)
Baha (disambiguation)
 Bohai (disambiguation)